al-Andalib Magazine is a children's magazine published by an organ of the National Ministry of Education in Morocco.

History 
The first issue of the magazine was published in 1975. Its purpose was to provide cultural enrichment for children. Publication stopped in 2007, then resumed in 2015.

References

1975 establishments in Morocco
Magazines established in 1975
All stub articles
State media
Arabic-language magazines